Willowdale is a subdivision  in the community of Cole Harbour in the Canadian province of Nova Scotia, located in the  Halifax Regional Municipality.

References
Willowdale on Destination Nova Scotia

Communities in Halifax, Nova Scotia